Lesley Martha Gibson (née Rowe, 21 March 1929 – 5 July 2011) was a New Zealand sprinter who, as Lesley Rowe, won a silver medal representing her country at the 1950 British Empire Games.

Early life and family
Rowe was born in the Auckland suburb of Grey Lynn on 21 March 1929, the daughter of Lawrence John Rowe and Clarice Rowe (née Downs). She was educated at Epsom Girls' Grammar School from 1943 to 1946, and was a prefect in her final year.

Athletics
Rowe won the New Zealand national 220 yards sprint title four times: in 1948, 1951, 1952, and 1953. In 1949, she finished second, and was the leading New Zealander, behind Shirley Strickland from Australia.

At the 1950 British Empire Games in Auckland, Rowe won the silver medal in the women's 440 yards relay alongside Shirley Hardman and Dorothea Parker, with a time of 48.7 seconds, which broke the previous Empire Games record. She also competed in the 220 yards, finishing sixth in the final. In the 660 yards relay, Rowe was in the New Zealand team alongside Ruth Dowman, Dorothea Parker and Shirley Hardman, but the quartet was disqualified after crossing the finish line in second place, as the baton was dropped and incorrectly retrieved at the final exchange.

Later life and death
Rowe married Robert Alan Gibson, and the couple went on to have two children. She died on 5 July 2011, having been predeceased by her husband.

References

1929 births
2011 deaths
Athletes from Auckland
New Zealand female sprinters
Commonwealth Games silver medallists for New Zealand
Athletes (track and field) at the 1950 British Empire Games
Commonwealth Games medallists in athletics
Medallists at the 1950 British Empire Games